Faragheh (also known as Ferāgha) is a village in Faragheh Rural District of the Central District of Abarkuh County, Yazd province, Iran. At the 2006 National Census, its population was 994 in 272 households. The following census in 2011 counted 1,059 people in 334 households. The latest census in 2016 showed a population of 1,040 people in 336 households; it was the largest village in its rural district.

References 

Abarkuh County

Populated places in Yazd Province

Populated places in Abarkuh County